Summer Sensation is an EP by the punk rock band Be Your Own Pet. The EP was released only a few weeks after their debut album Be Your Own Pet.

Track listing

References

Be Your Own Pet albums
2006 EPs
Ecstatic Peace! EPs